The 2014 ATP Vegeta Croatia Open Umag was a men's tennis tournament played on outdoor clay courts. It was the 25th edition of the Croatia Open, and was part of the ATP World Tour 250 Series of the 2014 ATP World Tour. It took place at the International Tennis Center in Umag, Croatia, from 21 July through 27 July 2014. Unseeded Pablo Cuevas, who entered the main draw as a qualifier, won the singles title.

Singles main draw entrants

Seeds 

 1 Rankings are as of July 14, 2014

Other entrants 
The following players received wildcards into the singles main draw:
  Borna Ćorić
  Mate Delić
  Ante Pavić

The following players received entry from the qualifying draw:
  Marco Cecchinato
  Pablo Cuevas
  Andrej Martin
  Horacio Zeballos

Withdrawals 
Before the tournament
  Alexandr Dolgopolov (knee injury)
  Santiago Giraldo
  Jürgen Melzer
  Leonardo Mayer

During the tournament
  Carlos Berlocq

Doubles main draw entrants

Seeds 

 Rankings are as of July 14, 2014

Other entrants 
The following pairs received wildcards into the doubles main draw:
  Toni Androić /  Marin Čilić
  Dino Marcan /  Nino Serdarušić

Finals

Singles 

  Pablo Cuevas defeated  Tommy Robredo, 6–3, 6–4

Doubles 

  František Čermák /  Lukáš Rosol  defeated  Dušan Lajović /  Franko Škugor, 6–4, 7–6(7–5)

References

External links 
 Official website

ATP Vegeta Croatia Open
2014
2014 in Croatian tennis